HiSET stands for High School Equivalency Test. It is an alternative to a United States high school diploma and the GED and TASC test. The test was designed based on the OCTAE College and Career Readiness Standards for Adult Education. It is governed by ETS and is provided in cooperation with relevant authority of the state or territories.

People who did not graduate from high school can earn a high school equivalency (HSE) credential with the HiSET test. Candidates are required to demonstrate that they have the same skills and knowledge as a high school graduate. Upon passing the test, candidates are issued a high school equivalency certificate or high school equivalency diploma by the respective state or jurisdiction in which they took the test.

Requirements
Each state or jurisdiction has its own testing requirements and policies. Fees and retesting rules sometimes vary. Besides that, some states have minimum age limits or requirements of in-state residency status. Some states require a candidate to take a preparation course before taking the exam.

References

Secondary education in Canada
Secondary education in the United States
School qualifications
Standardized tests in the United States
Adult education